VfB Auerbach is a German football club from the city of Auerbach, Saxony. The club also has a tennis department.

History
The association was founded as the Auerbacher Fußball Club on 17 May 1906 making it the second-oldest side in Vogtland. They won their first title in the second class Gau Vogtland, part of the VMBV (Verband Mittledeutschland Ballspiel Verein or Federation of Central German Ballgame Clubs), in 1908. AFC was officially registered on 20 June 1913 and after World War I on 18 April 1919, with the introduction of departments for athletics, tennis, and winter sports re-made itself as the sportsclub VfB Auerbach 1906.

In the aftermath of World War II occupying Allied authorities ordered the dissolution of existing organizations in the country, including sports and football clubs. In the fall of 1945 the club was re-established as the football department of Sport- und Kultur-Kartell Auerbach i.V.. A new sportsclub known as BSG KWU Auerbach was created out of SuKK Auerbach in 1949 and renamed BSG Einheit Auerbach on 6 January 1951. BSG was an unheralded local side in and out of the lower division Berziksliga Karl-Marx-Stadt (today Chemnitz) in East Germany. In 1989, shortly before the end of the DDR-era BSG was the largest sports club in Auerbach with departments for bowling, boxing, fencing, gymnastics, hiking, roller skating, tennis, and table tennis.

The club returned to its roots after German re-unification when it was re-established as VfB Auerbach and continued to play in what was now the sixth division Berzirksliga Chemnitz. By the mid-90s they were playing in the Landesliga Sachsen (V), and after three second-place finishes (1996, 2001, 2002), finally captured the division title in 2003 to earn promotion to the NOFV-Oberliga Süd (IV). VfB played in the Oberliga for nine seasons, initially struggling but then achieving three runners-up finishes in its last four seasons there. The last of those, in 2012, qualified the team for the reformed Regionalliga Nordost, where it plays today.

Current squad

Honours
 NOFV-Oberliga Süd
 Runners-up: 2009, 2011, 2012
 Landesliga Sachsen
 Champions: 2003
 Runners-up: 1996, 2001, 2002

Stadium
The club plays in the VfB Stadion built in 1921. It has a capacity of 5,000 and after renovations features 750 seats (1993) and floodlighting (1995).

References

External links

Abseits Guide to German Soccer
Das deutsche Fußball-Archiv historical German football league tables (in German)

Football clubs in Germany
Football clubs in East Germany
Association football clubs established in 1906
Football clubs in Saxony
1906 establishments in Germany